The Torre Lúgano is a residential building in Benidorm, Spain and measures 158 meters in height. It is the third tallest building in Benidorm, and the ninth tallest building in Spain.

See also
List of tallest buildings in Spain

References

Residential buildings in Spain